Carlos Rodríguez Márquez (born November 1, 1967) is a Mexican former shortstop in Major League Baseball. He played for the New York Yankees in 1991 and for the Boston Red Sox in 1994 and 1995.

Rodríguez had a career batting average of .278, and a career fielding percentage of .971.

He is the son of Mexican Baseball Hall of Famer Leo Rodríguez.

Carlos currently coaches his sons' travel baseball team called Midwest prospects.

Rodriguez now owns "The Strike Zone"; an indoor batting facility in central Ohio.

References

External links

1967 births
Baseball players from Mexico City
Boston Red Sox players
Living people
Major League Baseball shortstops
Major League Baseball players from Mexico
Mexican expatriate baseball players in the United States
Albany-Colonie Yankees players
Nashua Pride players
New York Yankees players
Baseball players at the 2003 Pan American Games
Pan American Games bronze medalists for Mexico
Pan American Games medalists in baseball
Medalists at the 2003 Pan American Games
Algodoneros de Unión Laguna players
Columbus Clippers players
Fort Lauderdale Yankees players
Gulf Coast Red Sox players
Gulf Coast Yankees players
Pawtucket Red Sox players
Vaqueros Laguna players